The Prince Edward Island order of precedence is a nominal and symbolic hierarchy of important positions within the province of Prince Edward Island. It has no legal standing but is used to dictate ceremonial protocol at events of a provincial nature.

 The King of Canada (His Majesty Charles III)
 The Lieutenant Governor of Prince Edward Island, or, in her official absence, the Administrator (Antoinette Perry)
 The Premier of Prince Edward Island (Dennis King)
 The mayor or other elected senior official of an incorporated municipality when the ceremony or event is hosted by or particularly involves that municipality
 The Chief Justice of Prince Edward Island
 The Speaker of the Legislative Assembly of Prince Edward Island
 Former lieutenant governors, with relative precedence governed by their date of leaving office 
 Former premiers, with relative precedence governed by their date of leaving office 
 Members of the Executive Council of Prince Edward Island 
 The Chief Justice of the Supreme Court of Prince Edward Island
 Justices of the Supreme Court of Prince Edward Island, with relative precedence governed by date of appointment 
 The Chief Judge of the Provincial Court of Prince Edward Island
 Judges of the Provincial Court of Prince Edward Island, with relative precedence governed by date of appointment 
 Members of the Legislative Assembly of Prince Edward Island 
Leader of the Opposition 
Deputy Speaker
Government House Leader
Opposition House Leader
Thereafter by date of first election, and if concurrent, then alphabetically) 
 Members of the Senate of Canada (by date of appointment) 
 Members of the House of Commons of Canada (members of the Federal Cabinet, then by date of first election, and if coincident, alphabetically) 
 Mayors or other elected senior officials of incorporated municipalities outside their municipality, alphabetically by municipality name 
 The Bishop of Charlottetown, the Bishop of Nova Scotia and the President of the Queens County Ministerial Association, with relative precedence governed by date of appointment or election 
 The Senior Officer for the Royal Canadian Mounted Police in Prince Edward Island 
 The President of the University of Prince Edward Island
 Deputy heads of departments, agencies, commissions and offices of the Provincial Government, with relative precedence governed by date of initial appointment as a Deputy Head

External links
Table of Precedence for Prince Edward Island from the Department of Canadian Heritage

Prince Edward Island